A religious school is a school that either has a religious component in its operations or its curriculum, or exists primarily for the purpose of teaching aspects of a particular religion.

Children
A school can either be of two types, though the same word is used for both in some areas:

Religious teaching
Institutions solely or largely for teaching a particular religion, often outside regular school
Cheder (Jewish)
Hebrew school (Jewish)
Madrasa (Muslim)
Sunday school (Christian)
Talmud Torah (Jewish)

General education
Institutions providing general education but run by a religious group, or in some way giving extra weight to a particular religion
Bais Yaakov (Jewish girls school)
Cathedral school (Christian)
Catholic school
Chabad (Jewish)
Christian school
Faith school UK term
Jewish day school
Lutheran school (Christian)
Madrasa (Muslim) also general education in some places
Parochial school USA in particular, former UK
Separate school Canada

Adults
Bible college (Christian)
Madrasa (Muslim)
Yeshiva (Jewish)

See also
Religion and children
Religious education
Religions
Secular education